Joseph or Joe Flynn may refer to:
Joe Flynn (comics)
Joe Flynn (American actor) (1924–1974), featured in the American sit-com McHale's Navy
Johnny Flynn (born 1983), British actor, musician and singer-songwriter
Joe Flynn (baseball) (1861–1933), 19th century baseball player
Joseph C. H. Flynn (1892–1941), American lawyer, politician, and judge
Joseph V. Flynn (1883–1940), U.S. representative from New York
Joseph P. Flynn, Chief Judge of the Connecticut Appellate Court
Joseph T. Flynn, American lawyer and politician from New York